The 1913 University of New Mexico football team was an American football team that represented the University of New Mexico as an independent during the 1913 college football season. In its third season under head coach Ralph Hutchinson (who was also the university's first athletic director), the team compiled a 3–2 record and outscored opponents by a total of 84 to 27. Halfback Fred "Fritz" Calkins was the team captain.

Schedule

References

University of New Mexico
New Mexico Lobos football seasons
University of New Mexico football